Nellie Zelda Star Boy Menard (June 3, 1910 – September 23, 2001) was an American quiltmaker and educator. In 1995, she received a National Heritage Fellowship.

Early life 
Nellie Zelda Star Boy was born on the Rosebud Indian Reservation in South Dakota, the daughter of Burton (Bert) Star Boy and Grace Jane Long Warrior. She was a member of the Sicangu Lakota (or Brulé) people. She graduated from the Flandreau Indian School.

Career 
Menard worked as an educator at the Flandreau as a young woman. During World War II, she operated the Rosebud Arts and Crafts Store in South Dakota and the Northern Plains Arts and Crafts Store in Browning, Montana. In 1941, she was one of four Native American artists invited to participate in an exhibition at the Museum of Modern Art in New York, where she met First Lady Eleanor Roosevelt. She worked for the Bureau of Indian Affairs in Rapid City for 30 years, assisting Dorothy Field as director of the Rapid City Museum, among other responsibilities.  

Menard became known as a community quiltmaker in the Northern Plains style, which involves one large colorful star made of diamond-shaped fabric pieces. She worked with the Michigan Traditional Arts Program at Michigan State University. In 1995, she received a National Heritage Fellowship from the National Endowment for the Arts, and the South Dakota Living Indian Treasure Award.

Personal life and legacy 
Star Boy married Clarence Menard. They had children Jack, Martina, D'Arcy, William, and Luther, and raised a number of other children. Her husband died in 1989, and she died in 2001, aged 91 years. Her quilts are in the collections of the National Museum of the American Indian, South Dakota Art Museum, Michigan State University, and the New England Quilt Museum.

References

External links 

 "Nellie Star Boy Menard and Mrs. Bordeaux", a photograph from about 1940, in the Helen M. Post Collection, Amon Carter Museum of American Art
 "Nellie Star Boy Menard at Fair", a photograph from about 1940, in the Helen M. Post Collection, Amon Carter Museum of American Art
 A star quilt by Nellie Star Boy Menard, in the collection of the Michigan State University Museum

1910 births
2001 deaths
Quilters
Rosebud Sioux people
People from Rosebud Indian Reservation, South Dakota
American women artists